Beit Rimon (lit. House of the Pomegranate) is a kibbutz located in the Lower Galilee Regional Council in  Israel. It consists of a core kibbutz and a residential expansion. It is located in the Lower Galilee on a ridge of Mount Tur'an at a height of 400 meters above sea level.

Etymology
It is named after the Biblical Rimon (pomegranate in Hebrew) in the lands of the Tribe of Zebulun (Joshua 19:13), which "is identified with er-Rumane" at today's Arab village of Rumana, 2 km to the west.

History
Beit Rimon was first settled in 1977 as a Nahal settlement. In 1979,  a group of British immigrants joined the Nahal group and established a kibbutz at the site, affiliated with the Religious Kibbutz Movement.

The kibbutz operates one of the largest dairy farms in the country, a chicken coop and a factory for agricultural and gardening tools. It also cultivates olives and field crops.

References

External links
Official website

Kibbutzim
Religious Kibbutz Movement
Populated places established in 1977
Nahal settlements
Populated places in Northern District (Israel)
1977 establishments in Israel